Daulatkhan() is a town in Bhola District in the division of Barisal, Bangladesh. It is the administrative headquarter and urban centre of Daulatkhan Upazila.

References

Populated places in Bhola District